Raghuvamsha Sudha is a popular kriti in Carnatic music, composed by Patnam Subramania Iyer in Sanskrit language. It is set in the raga Kadanakuthuhalam and is in Aadi tala. It has been rendered by several musicians, including: Chembai, M. S. Subbulakshmi, K. J. Yesudas;  Neyyattinkara Vasudevan, Amrutha Venkatesh, Mandolin U. Srinivas, and E. Gayathri. It is praising Lord Rama. The Cittasvara of this composition is composed by Tiruvayyar Subrahmaniya Iyer or popularly called Patnam Subramania Iyer

Raga structure
Aarohana  - Sa Ri Ma Dha Ni Ga Pa Sa

Avarohana - Sa Ni Dha Pa Ma Ga Ri Sa

Lyrics 
English

Pallavi : 
Raghu vamsa Sudhambudhi Chandra Sri 
-  -  रघुवंशसुधाम्बुधि  चन्द्र श्री   
Rama Rama Rajeswara  
-  - राम राम राजेश्वर

Anupallavi : 
Agha Megha maarutha Srikara 
-  - अघ मेघ मारुत श्रीकर   
Asuresha Mrigendra vara Jagannatha 
-  - असुरेश मृगेन्द्र वर जगन्नाथ

Sa - Ri Ma Ga - Re Sa Re - Ma Ma Da - Da Ni Ga - Ga Pa Sa,

Sa ni da pa ma ga, pa ma ga re.

Sa Re Re Ma - Ma Da Da Ni, Ga Pa Pa Sa - Sa Re Re Ma

Ma Ga Ga Re - Re Sa Sa Ni, Ni Da Da Pa - Pa Ma Ga Re

charana-1 : 
Jamadagnija garva khandhana  
-  - जमदग्निज-गर्व-खण्डन    
Jaya rudraadi vismitha bhandana 
-  - जय-रुद्रादि-विस्मित-भण्डन

Kamala aptha anvaya mandana  
-  -  कमलाप्तान्वय मन्दना

Aganita guna shourya shri venkatesha.

-  -  अघनित गुण शौर्य श्री वेङ्कटेशा ।

charana-2, which is often skipped : 
bhrgunandanA kavibhanjanA brndArakA brndAhitA 
nigamAntava su-budhAvanA nIrajAkSa shrI venkaTEshvara   
-  - निगमान्तव सुबुधावना नीरजाक्ष श्री वेङ्कटेश्वर

Telugu (తెలుగు)

రఘువంశ సుధాంబుధి చంద్ర శ్రీ

రఘువంశ సుధాంబుధి చంద్ర శ్రీ

రామ రామ రాజేశ్వర

రఘువంశ సుధాంబుధి చంద్ర శ్రీ

రామ రామ రాజేశ్వర

రఘువంశ సుధాంబుధి చంద్ర శ్రీ

అఘ మేఘ మారుత

అఘ మేఘ మారుత శ్రీ కర

అఘ మేఘ మారుత శ్రీ కర

అఘ మేఘ మారుత శ్రీ కర అశురేష మ్రిగేంద్ర వర జగన్నాథ

అసురేశ మృగేంద్ర వర జగన్నాథ

స రిమగ రిసరి మమద దనిగ

గపస సనిదప మగ పమగరి

స రిమగ రిసరి మమద దనిగ

గపస సనిదప మగపమ గరిస

రిమగ రిసరి మమద దనిగ

గపస సనిదప మగ పమ గరిసరి

రిమ మదదని గప పససరి రిమమగ గరిరిస సనినిద దపపమ గరిసరి

రిమ మదదని గప పససరి రిమమగ గరిరిస సనినిద దపపమ గరిగ

రఘువంశ సుధాంబుధి చంద్ర శ్రీ

రామ రామ రాజేశ్వర

రఘువంశ సుధాంబుధి చంద్ర శ్రీ

జమదగ్నిజ గర్వ ఖండన

జయ రుద్రాది విస్మిత భండన

జమదగ్నిజ గర్వ ఖండన జయ రుద్రాది విస్మిత భండన

కమలాప్తాన్వయ మండన

కమలాప్తాన్వయ మండన

కమలాప్తాన్వయ మండన అగణిత గుణ శౌర్య శ్రీ వేంకటేశా

అగణిత గుణ శౌర్య శ్రీ వేంకటేశా

స రిమగ రిసరి మమద దనిగ

గపస సనిదప మగ పమగరి

స రిమగ రిసరి మమద దనిగ

గపస సనిదప మగపమ గరి

స రిమగ రిసరి మమద దనిగ

గపస సనిదప మగ పమ గరి

స రిమగ రిసరి మమద దనిగ

గపస సనిదప మగ పమ గరి

స రిమగ రిసరి మమద దనిగ

గపస సనిదప మగ పమ గరిసరి

రిమ మదదని గప పససరి రిమమగ గరిరిస సనినిద దపపమ గరిసరి

రిమ మదదని గప పససరి రిమమగ గరిరిస సనినిద దపపమ గరిగ

రఘువంశ సుధాంబుధి చంద్ర శ్రీ

రామ రామ రాజేశ్వర

రఘువంశ సుధాంబుధి చంద్ర శ్రీ

References

Carnatic compositions